The British School of Guangzhou (BSG) is a British international school in Baiyun District, Guangzhou, China. The school caters to students from the ages of 1 to 18.

Administration

The British School of Guangzhou was founded in 2005 by the British Schools Foundation. In August 2013, the school was acquired by Nord Anglia Education.

Curriculum

The English National Curriculum (ENC), one of three major internationally recognized curricula, is followed at the school. Students who graduate from ENC schools can study at universities all over the world, usually without having to take any additional exams.

Global Initiatives

Nord Anglia Education students are linked through Global Campus, an initiative that connects students with their international counterparts through online communities.

Collaborations

Juilliard-Nord Anglia Performing Arts Programme

In February 2015, Nord Anglia Education and The Juilliard School announced a global collaboration to enhance performing arts education for students in grades K-12. The program includes an embedded curriculum along with continued support and engagement with Juilliard alumni and affiliated artists. It also includes teacher professional development, a summer school, and private lessons. The curriculum was launched in September 2015, and is expected to educate more than 20,000 students aged three to eighteen by 2017.

The curriculum focuses on key works of music, dance, and drama, as well as exciting opportunities for students to be visited by Juilliard alumni and to travel to New York for special workshops at The Juilliard School.

References

International schools in Guangzhou
Private schools in Guangdong
Cambridge schools in China
British international schools in China
Educational institutions established in 2005
Nord Anglia Education
Baiyun District, Guangzhou
2005 establishments in China